The La Liga Argentina de Básquet (abbreviated "LLA", and literally in English "The Argentine Basketball League"), previously known as the Torneo Nacional de Ascenso (abbreviated "TNA", and literally in English "National Promotion Tournament") is the second division of the Argentine basketball league system. The La Liga's predecessor is the Torneo Federal de Básquetbol, which became the third division when the LLA was created in 1992.

Competition format
La Liga Argentina consists of 28 teams, which are divided into four Divisions: North Center North, South, and Center South, with 7 teams per zone. The competition format is similar to that of Liga A, with a regular season divided into two stages. In the first stage, teams from the same division compete in a double round-robin format, with standings determined by a points system. Teams from the Center North and South Divisions will play two extra inter-zone matches.

After the first phase, each team carries over 100% of the points obtained to the second stage. In the second stage, two Conferences (North and South) are formed uniting the four divisions, so each Conference has a total of 13 teams each. A new double round-robin series of matches take place, with the final standings in each conference determined by the same points system of the first stage.

The final stage of the tournament follows a playoff format. The top four teams from each Conference advance directly to the Conference quarterfinals, while the teams ranked from 5th to 12th place in each Conference compete in a separate bracket to allocate the remaining berths for the Conference quarterfinals. Every series in this final stage follow a best-of-five format. The winning team of the Finals will earn a spot in the top tier the following year.

Current clubs (2021)

North Conference

South Conference

List of champions

Finals

Championships by club

References

External links
 

1992 establishments in Argentina
Basketball leagues in Argentina
Professional sports leagues in Argentina
Sports leagues established in 1992